Epsilon Island is one of the Montebello Islands located at  off the Pilbara Coast of Western Australia.

Surrounding islands include:
 Ah Chong Island
 Alpha Island
 Aster Island
 Banksia Island
 Brooke Island
 Buttercup Island
 Campbell Island
 Carnation Island 
 Dot Island
 Daisy Island
 Flag Island
 Gannet Island 
 Hermite Island
 Marigold Island
 Primrose Island

See also
List of named islands in the Montebello Islands archipelago

References

Montebello Islands archipelago